"Fuck Authority" is a song written and recorded by American punk rock band Pennywise. It was released in July 2001 as the lead single (and only charting single) from the band's sixth studio album Land of the Free?. The song reached number 38 on the Modern Rock Tracks chart.

Music video
The music video was directed by Glen Bennett and was released in April 2001. While the video shows the band playing on a stage, it features different scenes of riots and historical places, such as Tiananmen Square.

Censorship
"Fuck Authority" was banned from airplay after September 11, 2001.

Charts

References

2001 singles
Pennywise (band) songs
2001 songs
Epitaph Records singles